The A380 is a road in South West England, connecting the Torbay area to the Devon Expressway, and hence to the rest of Great Britain's main road network.

Route
It then proceeds in a generally southerly direction, climbing over the Haldon Hills before descending past the towns of Kingsteignton and Newton Abbot and continuing on a single carriageway flyover over the Penn Inn roundabout heading towards Torquay.

Beyond Newton Abbot, the road bypasses the village of Kingskerswell on the South Devon Highway. The road soon comes to Edginswell (a signal controlled junction) at Torquay where it meets the A3022 that (as Dual carriageway) serves the large seaside resort of Torquay. Prior to the construction of the Kingkerswell bypass, the A380 passed through Kingkerswell (although the original route was along Fore Street) and into Torquay along the current A3022 terminating on the now declassified Union Street which was then the A379. Another branch ran past Torre Abbey to the sea front.

Kingskerswell bypass
There have been plans to alleviate the traffic congestion on the stretch of the road between Newton Abbot and Torquay since 1951. Construction of a bypass around Kingskerswell was almost authorised by the Department for Transport, with construction to start in 2010 and completion in 2013, but in March 2009 it was suggested that with the economic recession there may not be sufficient money left for constructing a bypass, since money was awarded to other road building schemes elsewhere in the UK the previous autumn. A public enquiry was held in 2009. In October 2010 the government refused to fund the scheme, and placed it in a funding pool to compete against 33 other schemes nationwide for a £600 million development fund. However, in November 2011 the government awarded £74.6 million towards the cost of the bypass, with construction to start the following year. Construction began in October 2012 with the road completed and opened in December 2015. This new section of road is designated the South Devon Highway.

Penn Inn Roundabout

The Penn Inn Roundabout is a signal-controlled roundabout interchange at Newton Abbot where the A380 used to meet the A381 and an unclassified road at one of the busiest roundabouts in Devon. The A380 now continues over the roundabout on a single carriageway flyover continuing to Exeter as part of the South Devon Highway (Traffic can still get to the roundabout off the dual carriageway using the other lane). This is to relieve congestion especially at peak times. There is a completely separate system of subways for pedestrians underneath the roundabout.

It is a junction which is noted for being subject to very high vehicle flows (in 2008, 73000 vehicles per day entered the roundabout) and as a result can be subject to long queues at peak times. Various upgrades have been made to the junction since its construction in an effort to increase capacity; it now has four lanes on the A381 approach and northern section of the roundabout. The Kingskerswell bypass completed in December 2015 has a single carriageway flyover north–south so that through traffic on the A380 dual carriageway does not have to negotiate the junction.

The junction takes its name from the similarly named adjacent Penn Inn pub which in May 2015 was acquired by Mitchells & Butlers and rebranded as Toby Carvery.

See also
 A roads in Zone 3 of the Great Britain numbering scheme

References

Roads in England
Transport in Devon
Roads in Devon